This article represents all appearances that Emmylou Harris has contributed to, in collaboration with artists from G to K.

Other sections 
Solo contributions
Collaborations A–F
Collaborations L–Q
Collaborations R–Z

 Harris performs the bass part, while Welch, who has the lowest register voice of the trio, was given the soprano part.
 Harris plays guitar but does not sing on this track.

References

Country music discographies
Lists of songs
 Emmylou Harris appearances
 Emmylou Harris appearances
Folk music discographies
Musical collaborations